Lucas Edouard Créange (born 26 October 1992 in Troyes) is a French Paralympic table tennis player. At the 2020 Summer Paralympics, he won a bronze medal in the Men's individual class 11 event. He has also competed at the INAS Global Games where he won two bronze medals, and is a World and European champion in team events.

References

External links
 
 
 

1992 births
Living people
French male table tennis players
Paralympic table tennis players of France
Paralympic bronze medalists for France
Paralympic medalists in table tennis
Table tennis players at the 2016 Summer Paralympics
Table tennis players at the 2020 Summer Paralympics
Medalists at the 2020 Summer Paralympics
Sportspeople from Troyes
20th-century French people
21st-century French people